"Heaven's Open" is a single by musician Mike Oldfield, released in 1991 (see 1991 in music).  It was the lead single from the album of the same name.  The various formats were backed by a mix of the A-side which featured a melodic guitar line not included in the album version, along with two excerpts from Amarok, Oldfield's previous album.

Oldfield was credited as "Michael" on this release, while producer and long-term collaborator Tom Newman was listed as "Thom Newman". This is also from the last of Oldfield's albums with Virgin Records.

Demo version 
The song that became "Heaven's Open", was originally an early version of "Man in the Rain", planned for Oldfield's Islands album, with vocals by Barry Palmer. To get a 'loose' feel to the song, Oldfield encouraged the musicians to have a few drinks; this version however was deemed as too loose and not used.

Oldfield performed the vocals himself on the final version.

Music video 
The music video is available on the Elements – The Best of Mike Oldfield and is part cartoon and part live action. Oldfield sings, plays guitar and looks into a crystal ball. Oldfield plays a PRS Artist Custom in the video. The animated content is sourced from a film called Album by Croatian film company called Zagreb Film.

Track listing 
 "Heaven's Open" – 4:31
 "Amarok" (excerpt I) – 3:09
 "Heaven's Open" (12" mix) – 4:33
 "Amarok" (excerpt V) – 2:29

References 

1991 singles
Mike Oldfield songs
Song recordings produced by Tom Newman (musician)
Songs written by Mike Oldfield
Virgin Records singles
1990 songs